The Beijing Dance Academy (BDA) is a municipal public professional dance college at Haidian, Beijing. The academy is the highest institution for dance education and assessment in the People's Republic of China, conducting the nationwide teacher qualification level examinations in Chinese dance.  

The Beijing Dance Academy was established as the Beijing Dance School in 1954, and turned into the Beijing Dance Academy with the approval of State Council and the sponsorship of the Ministry of Culture in 1978. In 2000, its sponsorship was transferred to the Beijing Municipal People's Government. The Academy provides BA and MA degrees and has become the only institution of higher learning for professional dance education in China.

The Academy, known as "the Cradle of Dancers" and adjacent to Zizhuyuan Park, Haidian District, has about 600 in-service faculty and staff, and 2,500 full-time students apart from over 5,000 students from the School of Continuing Education. Every year, the School of Dance Grade Education trains over 50,000 teachers of dance grade examination at home and abroad, and nearly 500,00 students take the examinations at different levels.

The Academy now provides such divisions as the Department of Chinese Classical Dance, the Department of Chinese Ethnic and Folk Dance, Ballroom dance Department, Ballet Department, Musical Department, Creative School (consisting of departments of Choreography, Modern Dance, Art Design), Humanities School (consisting of departments of Dance Studies, Art Communication, General Education, and Ideological and Political Science), Education School, BDA Youth Dance Company, School of Continuing Education, School of Dance Grade Examination and Affiliated Secondary School of BDA, involving academic areas of dance performance, dance studies, choreography, dance education, art design, etc.

Departments 
 The Department of Chinese Classical Dance 
 The Department of Chinese Ethnic and Folk Dance 
 The Ballet Department 
 The Department of Choreography 
 The Department of Dance Studies
 The Department of Social Dance
 The Department of Musical Theater
 The Department of Art Communication
 The Department of Art Design
 The Education and Research Center for Modern Dance
 The Department of Liberal Arts
 Graduate Faculty 
 The School of Continuing Education
 The School of Dance Grading Examination and Education
 The Affiliated Secondary School of BDA
 Youth Dance Company

Notable alumni 
Xuan Lu - actress and professional ballet dancer
 Chi Cao - male ballet dancer; Principal Dancer, Birmingham Royal Ballet; film actor and dancer, Mao's Last Dancer (2009)
 Li Cunxin - male ballet dancer
 Liu Shishi - television actress of The Young Warriors (2006), The Legend of the Condor Heroes (2008), The Heaven Sword and the Dragon Saber (2009), and most known for Scarlet Heart (2011)
 Liu Yan - female classical dancer
 Song Qian - idol, member of the South Korean girl group f(x); actress in China and Korea under the stage name Victoria Song
 Wang Yan - television actress of My Fair Princess II and My Fair Princess III
 Zhang Ziyi - actress
 Wang Likun - television and film actress
 Wei Wang - male ballet dancer; Principal Dancer, San Francisco Ballet
 Zhang Huiwen - film actress
 Huang Xuan - television and film actor
 Dong Sicheng - member of the South Korean boy group NCT and its China-based subunit WayV under the stage name WinWin
 An Yuexi - film actress; graduated from Musical Theatre Department
 Chengwu Guo - male ballet dancer
 Wan Peng - television actress
 Jiang Mengjie - actress
 Ayanga - musical theater actor, dancer, and singer of Mongol ethnicity
 Zheng Yunlong - musical theater actor and singer
 Wang Yijin - idol and actress, member of BonBon Girls 303
 Zhang Yifan - idol and actress, member of BonBon Girls 303
 Zhao Xiaotang - idol and actress, former member of C-Pop girl group THE9

References

External links 
 Beijing Dance Academy

 
Dance schools in China
Culture in Beijing
Universities and colleges in Haidian District
Educational institutions established in 1954
1954 establishments in China